Yanuca is an inhabited coral island in Fiji. It is administratively part of the Serua province.  It is characterized by white sandy beaches and lush vegetation, and is now a camping site.

Islands of Fiji
Lau Islands